Oneil Nester Levy (born 10 April 1983) is a former Bahamian cricketer. Levy is a right-handed batsman who was a right-arm bowler, although his style is unknown. Levy represented the Bahamas national cricket team in 5 matches.

Levy made his debut for the Bahamas in the 2002 ICC Americas Championship against the United States.

In 2002, he represented the Americas U-19's in the 2002 West Indies Cricket Board Under-19 Tournament, where he played in 5 matches for the team.

Levy made his Twenty20 appearance for the Bahamas against the Cayman Islands in the 1st round of the 2006 Stanford 20/20. Levy scored 19 runs, with the Bahamas losing by 57 runs. This was Levy's final appearance for the Bahamas.

References

External links
Oneil Levy at Cricinfo
Oneil Levy at CricketArchive

1983 births
Living people
Bahamian cricketers